East West Line may refer to several rapid transit lines:

 East–West MRT line, Singapore
 East West Corridor, the construction codename of the Tuen Ma line in Hong Kong
 East-West Passenger Rail, a proposed passenger rail corridor between Boston and Western Massachusetts, United States
 East-West Line, former name of the Blue Line (MARTA) in Georgia, United States
 East West Line commonly called the East West Rail, a proposed rail line in England between Oxford and Cambridge
 East West Line commonly called the Busan Metro Line 2 or the Dongseo Line, a rail line in Busan, South Korea

Japanese

 can refer to one of several Japanese railway lines:

 JR Tōzai Line, operated by JR West mainly in Osaka Prefecture
 Tōzai Line (Kobe), operated by Kobe Rapid Railway in Kobe, Hyogo Prefecture
 Tōzai Line (Kyoto), operated by Kyoto Municipal Transportation Bureau in Kyoto
 Tōzai Line (Sapporo), operated by the Sapporo City Transportation Bureau in Sapporo, Hokkaido
 Tokyo Metro Tōzai Line, operated by Tokyo Metro in Tokyo
 Sendai Subway Tōzai Line, a line of the Sendai Subway, currently under construction

See also
 East and West Junction Railway, a disused line in central England
 North–South Line (disambiguation)
 Central line (disambiguation)
 Crossrail (disambiguation)